Yahya ibn Abd al-Aziz was the last ruler of the Hammadids from 1121 to 1152, when the dynasty's rule was ended by the Almohad Caliphate.

Hammadids
1152 deaths
Year of birth unknown
12th-century rulers in Africa
12th-century Berber people